Tang-e Anar-e Olya (also Romanized as Tang-e Anār-e ‘Olyā) is a village in Poshteh-ye Zilayi Rural District, Sarfaryab District, Charam County, Kohgiluyeh and Boyer-Ahmad Province, Iran. At the 2006 census, its population was 75, in 19 families.

References 

Populated places in Charam County